Ermita de Santiago (Monsacro) is an ancient stone octagonal Roman Catholic hermitage in the municipality of Morcín, autonomous community of Asturias, Spain. It is located near the peak of Monsacro.

See also
Asturian art
Catholic Church in Spain
Churches in Asturias
List of oldest church buildings

References

Churches in Asturias
Christian hermitages in Spain
Bien de Interés Cultural landmarks in Asturias